Norah Blaney (16 July 18937 December 1983), born Norah Mignon Cordwell was a pianist, composer, comedienne and music hall performer. She recorded hundreds of songs between 1921 and 1935, many with her performing partner Gwen Farrar.

Biography
Blaney was born Norah Mignon Cordwell in Shepherd's Bush, London on 16 July 1893. Her father, Walter Henry Cordwell was a musician and her mother was Mary Jane (Molly), née Thatcher.

In 1906 she was awarded the Erard pianoforte scholarship to the Royal Academy of Music followed by a scholarship at the Royal College of Music. She began using her stage name in 1910, after her maternal grandmother.

On 10 October 1914, she married pianist, Albert Charles Lyne, however, 4 years later he died while serving with the London Scottish regiment in France. In 1922, she married for a second time, to Philip Barron Bruce Durham; they divorced in June 1931. She married for a final time to Basil Hughes on 20 February 1932.

Blaney died on 7 December 1983 at the Actors’ Retirement Home in Northwood, London.

Act with Farrar

Blaney and Farrar were both members of Lena Ashwell's group of entertainers for World War I soldiers in France, initially as classical artists. However, the pair started a ragtime duet, which gained popularity. They brought the act back to the UK and performed it in London Hippodrome regularly during 1921.

The pair lived together in Chelsea in 1917, remaining there until 1922. They performed in Vaudeville Theatre productions around London. In 1925, they toured USA, including appearing on Broadway and in Palm Beach, Florida. However, in 1926, Farrar broke off their partnership, and Blaney returned to England.

Blaney and Farrar began working together again in 1930, but after she injured her foot while performing in 1931, Blaney married her surgeon, Basil Hughes. She spent time in a nursing home recuperating from infection before retiring from performing generally, though she did the odd piece of work with Farrar.

Legacy
Blaney and Farrar are considered "LGBT+ icons". In 2014 Alison Child and Rosie Wakley created a play called "All The Nice Girls" based on the relationship between Blaney and Farrar.

References

External links

1893 births
1983 deaths
Music hall performers
British LGBT singers
20th-century British LGBT people